Trial was launched at Belfast in 1803. Apparently for most of her career she was initially an Irish coaster. A French privateer captured and burnt her in 1810 while she was returning to Ireland from Gibraltar.

Trial first appeared in Lloyd's Register (LR) in 1804.

Juno burnt Trial.

Citations

1803 ships
Captured ships
Maritime incidents in 1810